Aluche is a barrio of the city of Madrid, situated in the southwest of the city, in the Latina district. It is bounded by the barrios of Campamento, Las Águilas, Lucero, Los Cármenes, and the Carabanchel district. Casa de Campo is also nearby. Aluche takes its name from the Luche creek that formerly flowed through the neighbourhood.

With 75,871 inhabitants, it is the largest of Madrid's barrios (according to the 2001 census). Many of its streets are named after towns and villages of the province of Toledo. Gómez Ulla Military Hospital is located in the area.

External links
 Aluche en Internet
Large meeting on a housing estate in Aluche Park, Madrid in the 1980s
 Asociación de Vecinos Puerto Chico perteneciente al barrio de Aluche

Wards of Madrid